Password is a 2019 Indian Bengali-language vigilante action thriller film directed by Kamaleswar Mukherjee. The film starring Dev, Parambrata Chattopadhyay, Paoli Dam, Rukmini Maitra while Adrit Roy and Trina Saha played supporting roles. The film revolves around the dark side of social networking, and deals with stealing of password and privacy issue.It was released on 2 October 2019. Upon release, the film received critical acclaim, where critics praised the concept, action sequences, visual effects, message, music and cast performances. Despite receiving critical acclaim, the film didn't managed to do well at the box-office.

Plot
A conscientious police officer trying to track down a criminal who is hell bent on hacking into vital information and destroying human lives, finds himself in a web of violence, deceit, and double crossing, as well as shades of pathos in the life of criminals. To destroy this web of cyber crime, he forms a team with ethical hackers. Will he be able to stop them before it's too late ? Will he be finally able to get these villains into justice?

Set in the backdrop of 1984 Bhopal disaster, where Ismailov's parents died amidst the leakage of methyl isocyanate in the disaster of Bhopal. Failing to get justice, Ismailov takes the law into his own hands to kill Joseph Anderson, CEO of A to Z e-commerce and the main mastermind behind this Gas tragedy, along with all his associates. DCP Rohit Dasgupta of Kolkata Police investigates to find out Ismailov and his den of Onion in Bhopal, who hacks Byblis and Darling tone software, a part of the A to Z e-commerce company, thus making his base in the Indian Subcontinent. Ismailov also hacks the IMF server and gets all defence insecurities illegally.

Cast
 Dev as DCP Rohit Dasgupta, a trained cyber expert from IIT Kharagpur (Main Protagonist) 
 Rukmini Maitra as Nisha Chatterjee, an ethical hacker 
 Parambrata Chatterjee as Ismailov, a darknet mastermind (Main Antagonist) 
 Paoli Dam as Mariom, Ismailov's wife & partner of darknet  
 Adrit Roy as Advait Upadhyay, Nisha's Boyfriend
 Krishno Kishore Mukhopadhyay as RAW chief Uttam Barua
 Trina Saha as Tina, Nisha's Sister
 Abhisekh Singh as Ismailov's assistant
 Saurav Das, a cameo in the so 'Aye Khuda'

Soundtrack 

The soundtrack is composed by Savvy and lyrics by Riddhi Barua and Soham Majumdar.

Marketing and release 
The official teaser of the film was unveiled by Dev Entertainment Ventures on 15 August 2019. The official 4K teaser 2 of the film was unveiled by Dev Entertainment Ventures on 1 September 2019.

The film flopped at box-office. Some scenes are modified like a nude woman's back side has been blurred, skulls scattering everywhere are blurred. Some violent portions have also been trimmed.
It was released on 2 October, coinciding with 2019 Puja holidays.

References

2019 films
Bengali-language Indian films
2010s Bengali-language films
Indian action thriller films
Films directed by Kamaleshwar Mukherjee
Techno-thriller films
Films produced by Dev (Bengali actor)
2019 action thriller films